Xu Jingjie (Chinese: 许景杰; pinyin: Xǔ Jǐngjié; born 4 February 1986) is a Chinese footballer who currently plays for Qingdao Jonoon in the China League One.

Club career
Xu started his professional football career in 2005 when he was promoted to Qingdao Jonoon's first squad. He made his senior debut on 15 October, in a 1–1 away draw against Tianjin Teda. On 5 May 2011, he scored his first senior goal in the first round of 2011 Chinese FA Cup, however, Qingdao Jonoon lost to China League One club Guangdong Sunray Cave in the penalty shootout. On 15 April 2011, he was involved in a brawl during a match with Shanghai Shenxin, which resulted in a ban of 5 matches and him being fined ¥25,000. He scored his first and second league goals on 13 July 2013, in a 3–3 away draw with Dalian Aerbin.

Career statistics 

Statistics accurate as of match played 1 November 2015

References

1986 births
Living people
Association football defenders
Chinese footballers
Footballers from Qingdao
Qingdao Hainiu F.C. (1990) players
Chinese Super League players
China League One players